Robita is a fictional character, a robot who appears in Osamu Tezuka's manga series Phoenix. She is also a character in the modern Astro Boy animated series.

Phoenix
Robita first appears (in the chronological order of the manga release) in Future, where he is a grey cylindrical robot with an ellipsoid head, the eyes being a slit and his arms being articulated with claws. He is an assistant to an old recluse mad scientist called Dr. Saruta, the last descendant of the Sarutas in the Phoenix continuity. Although Robita may only be a robot, he shows signs of personality and kindness, which even astonishes Saruta himself.

In the Resurrection episode, the origins of Robita have been revealed. He is actually the combined minds of Leon, a human, and Chihiro, a robot, who have been loaded up into an android by Dr. Weekday, a mad scientist who worked for an organ-smuggling crime ring.

Leon, a young man who died in a rigged car accident, is surgically resurrected with artificial brain implants. The side effect of these new organs changes the way he perceives the world: he ses, hears and feels humans and other living things as repulsive and intimidating jumbles of rocks. His mind having become closer to a robot's than a human, he sees machines and robots as beauties and marvels of nature. This is how he meets Chihiro, a factory worker robot. Although "she" normally looks like an ugly and cold insect-like automaton, Leon considers her as a beautiful and charming young girl wearing an antennae hat. He falls in love which she reciprocates, but their love is forbidden, the company not wanting to let go of Chihiro.

After Leon finds out his death was ordered by some of his relatives because he hunted the Phoenix and got its much-coveted blood, he runs away with her and reaches an organ-smuggling crime headquarters. The female leader of the operations falls in love with Leon, who rejects her, and she decides to forcefully combine her body with his by surgery of a mad scientist working for her, Dr. Weekday. After a last request by Leon on Weekday, he agrees to load his mind into Chihiro... but the girl-robot does not have enough memory space in her body. Weekday combines them into a bigger robot. Leon-Chihiro gradually forgets his/her memories and runs away, being taken in by a family, who enjoys his/her gentleness, knowledge of human games and trustworthiness. Leon-Chihiro is then copied and mass-produced worldwide, as popular household and nanny robots. His/her new name is Robita.

Yet, one day, a boy is accidentally killed by radiation inside an isotope field. His parents, not wanting to take responsibility for the accident, blame Robita. After a long trial, Robita and the Robitas working in the field are found guilty and ordered to be destroyed. All the other Robitas around the world decide to also destroy themselves upon learning the news, and go into collective suicide.

Only one Robita remains, one working on the Moon for Acetylene Lamp, a space transport officer. Robita tells him he feels human, and is sure about that. Lamp, revolted by a robot having such idea, tells him that he couldn't be unless he proved himself, such as killing him for treating him like a slave. Robita does so, in an indirect way, and is left alone on the moon, crying over his guilt, until he is found one day by wandering scientist Dr. Saruta, who takes him under his wing as his assistant.

Robita serves Saruta as his trustworthy assistant for decades, until he is shot and destroyed by Rock.

Astro Boy

1980 series
Robita played a very minor role in the episode "Save the Carolina 3" of the 1980 series as a domestic robot working at a space station.

2003 series
Robita's character, known as Nora in the English version, has been reused for the 2003 anime series of Astro Boy. The robot keeps his cylindrical body and ellipsoid head, but is given a less dark and more cartoonish look: yellow color, telescopic arms and green bubbly eyes. The character also saw a change in gender, being referred to as 'she'.

Her role is major, yet passive, throughout the series. She is generally shown to be a source of information, added to show a sense of family in the household, or even as comic relief.

She appeared in the videogame Astro Boy.

Trivia
The protagonist of Saya no Uta shared very similar fate with Leon/Robita.

References

External links
Robita Pictures of Robita statues of the way he looks throughout the Phoenix series

Fictional robots
Osamu Tezuka characters
Astro Boy
Male characters in anime and manga